The Arcadia Stakes is an American Thoroughbred horse race run in early April at Santa Anita Park in Arcadia, California. Open to horses four years of age and older, it is raced on turf over a distance of one mile. A Grade II race, it currently offers a purse of $200,000.

Inaugurated in 1988 as the El Rincon Handicap, it was renamed the Arcadia Handicap in 2001 after the original Arcadia Handicap had been renamed the Frank E. Kilroe Mile Handicap.

Two Lea won this race in 1949.

From 1998 through 2004, the race was run at a distance of  miles.

Records
Time record: 
 1:33.09 – Bolo (2016)

Most wins:
 2 – Steinlen (1988, 1990)

Most wins by an owner:
 3 – Juddmonte Farms (1992, 1996, 2004)

Most wins by a jockey:
 5 – Gary Stevens (1988, 1992, 1996, 1998, 2015)

Most wins by a trainer:
 5 – Neil D. Drysdale (1989, 1997, 1998, 2011, 2014)
 4 – Robert J. Frankel (1992, 1993, 1996, 2004)

Winners of the Arcadia Stakes

References
Arcadia Handicap at the NTRA

Graded stakes races in the United States
Open mile category horse races
Turf races in the United States
Horse races in California
Santa Anita Park
1988 establishments in California
Recurring sporting events established in 1988